Jacobi's theorem can refer to:
Maximum power theorem, in electrical engineering
The result that the determinant of skew-symmetric matrices with odd size vanishes, see skew-symmetric matrix
Jacobi's four-square theorem, in number theory
Jacobi's theorem (geometry), on concurrent lines associated with any triangle
Jacobi's theorem on the normal indicatrix, in differential geometry
Jacobi's theorem on conjugate points, in differential geometry